Eichel is a German word which means "acorn". It may refer to:

Hans Eichel (born 1941), German politician
Jack Eichel, American ice hockey player
Steve Eichel, American psychologist
Eichel (card suit), one of the four suits in German pattern playing cards
Eichel (river), a tributary of the Saar in northeastern France

German-language surnames